One third of Cambridge City Council is elected each year, followed by one year without election.

Political control

Leadership

The leaders of the council since 2003 have been:

Seats on Council

Council elections
1973 Cambridge City Council election
1976 Cambridge City Council election (New ward boundaries)
1978 Cambridge City Council election
1979 Cambridge City Council election
1980 Cambridge City Council election
1982 Cambridge City Council election
1983 Cambridge City Council election
1984 Cambridge City Council election
1986 Cambridge City Council election
1987 Cambridge City Council election
1988 Cambridge City Council election
1990 Cambridge City Council election
1991 Cambridge City Council election
1992 Cambridge City Council election
1994 Cambridge City Council election
1995 Cambridge City Council election
1996 Cambridge City Council election
1998 Cambridge City Council election
1999 Cambridge City Council election
2000 Cambridge City Council election
2002 Cambridge City Council election
2003 Cambridge City Council election
2004 Cambridge City Council election (New ward boundaries)
2006 Cambridge City Council election
2007 Cambridge City Council election
2008 Cambridge City Council election
2010 Cambridge City Council election
2011 Cambridge City Council election
2012 Cambridge City Council election
2014 Cambridge City Council election
2015 Cambridge City Council election
2016 Cambridge City Council election
2018 Cambridge City Council election
2019 Cambridge City Council election
2021 Cambridge City Council election

By-election results

1994-1998

1998-2002

2002-2006

2006-2010

2010-2014

2014-2018

2018-2022

2022-2026

References

External links
Cambridge City Council
Cambridge City Election Results since 1945

 
Council elections in Cambridgeshire
Politics of Cambridge
District council elections in England